This is a list of soccer video games based on/licensed by the J.League.

The first licensed game, J-League Fighting Soccer, was released for the Game Boy on December 27, 1992. Two months later J-League Champion Soccer was released for the Mega Drive. J-League Greatest Eleven was released for the PC Engine a day before the start of the inaugural season.

Since then, other titles were released for many other platforms. Popular franchises include: Pro Striker, Excite Stage, Prime Goal, Victory Goal, Perfect Striker, Pro Soccer Club o Tsukurou! and Winning Eleven.

In 2002, Konami released Captain Tsubasa: Eikou no Kiseki for the Game Boy Advance, the only game from the Captain Tsubasa series which is licensed by J.League.

These games are based exclusively on the J.League, however the titles released more recently also contain other leagues.

The recent Winning Eleven titles (2012, 2013) are fully licensed by the J.League.

With EA Sports acquiring the license for the league for FIFA 17, the J.League will make its first real appearance in a football game by Western developers.

3DO
J-League Virtual Stadium (11/03/94, published by Electronic Arts Victor)
J-League Virtual Stadium '95 (10/27/95, published by Electronic Arts Victor)

Arcade
J-League Soccer V-Shoot (1994, published by Namco)
J-League Prime Goal EX (1996, published by Namco)

Dreamcast
J-League Pro Soccer Club o Tsukurou! (09/30/99, developed by Smilebit and published by Sega)
Soccer Tsuku Tokudai Gou J-League Pro Soccer Club o Tsukurou! (12/21/00, published by Sega)
Soccer Tsuku Tokudai Gou 2: J-League Pro Soccer Club o Tsukurou! (12/13/01, published by Sega)
J-League Spectacle Soccer (02/07/02, developed by Smilebit and published by Sega)

Family Computer
J-League Fighting Soccer (06/19/93, developed by Graphic Research and published by IGS)
J-League Super Top Players (04/22/94, developed by Tose and published by Bandai)
J-League Winning Goal (05/27/94, developed by Graphic Research and published by Electronic Arts Victor)

FM Towns
J.League Professional Soccer 1994 (1994, published by Victor Entertainment)

Game Boy
J-League Fighting Soccer (12/27/92, developed by Graphic Research and published by IGS)
J-League Winning Goal (04/02/94, developed by Graphic Research and published by Electronic Arts Victor)
J-League Live '95 (04/21/95, developed by Graphic Research and published by Electronic Arts Victor)
J-League Big Wave Soccer (11/24/95, developed by Jupiter Multimedia and published by Tomy Corporation)
Nihon Daihyou Team France de Ganbare!: J-League Supporter Soccer (06/26/98, published by J-Wing)

Game Boy Advance
J-League Pocket (03/21/01, developed and published by Konami)
Captain Tsubasa: Eikou no Kiseki (02/21/02, published by Konami)
J-League Pocket 2 (02/28/02, developed and published by Konami)
J-League Pro Soccer Club o Tsukurou! Advance (09/05/02, developed by Smilebit and published by Sega)
J-League Winning Eleven Advance 2002 (10/10/02, developed and published by Konami)

Game Boy Color
J-League Excite Stage GB (08/13/99, published by Epoch)
J-League Excite Stage Tactics (07/20/01, published by Epoch)

NEC PC-9801
J. League Hyper Soccer: Wave no Arashi (06/25/93, published by C^2 World Ltd.)
J. League Professional Soccer 1993 (07/16/93, published by Victor Entertainment)
J. League Professional Soccer 1994 (07/22/94, published by Victor Entertainment)
J. League Professional Soccer 1995 (07/21/95, published by Victor Entertainment)

Nintendo 64
Jikkyō J-League: Perfect Striker (12/20/96, developed and published by Konami)
J-League Live 64 (03/28/97, published by Electronic Arts Victor)
J-League Dynamite Soccer 64 (09/05/97, developed by A-Max and published by Imagineer)
J-League Eleven Beat 1997 (10/24/97, published by Hudson Soft)
J-League Tactics Soccer (01/15/99, published by ASCII Entertainment)
Jikkyou J-League 1999 Perfect Striker 2 (07/29/99, developed and published by Konami)

Nintendo DS
Soccer Tsuku DS: Touch and Direct (11/20/08, published by Sega)
Soccer Tsuku DS: World Challenge 2010 (05/27/10, published by Sega)

PC Engine
J-League Greatest Eleven (05/14/93, developed by Cream and published by Nichibutsu)
Formation Soccer on J-League (01/15/94, published by Human Entertainment)
J-League Tremendous Soccer '94 (12/23/94, developed by HuneX and published by NEC Home Electronics)

PlayStation
J-League Jikkyō Winning Eleven (07/21/95, developed and published by Konami)
J-League Soccer Prime Goal EX (09/29/95, published by Namco)
J-League Virtual Stadium '96 (04/26/96, developed by EA Sports and published by Electronic Arts Victor)
J-League Jikkyō Winning Eleven 97 (11/22/96, developed and published by Konami)
J-League Jikkyō Winning Eleven 3 (12/11/97, developed and published by Konami)
Combination Pro Soccer: J.League no Kantoku ni Natte Sekai wo Mezase! (06/18/98, developed by Kuusoukagaku and published by Axela)
J-League Jikkyō Winning Eleven '98-'99 (12/03/98, developed and published by Konami)
Jikkyō J-League 1999 Perfect Striker (12/02/99, developed and published by Konami)
J-League Soccer: Jikkyō Survival League (12/22/99, published by Tecmo)
J-League Jikkyō Winning Eleven 2000 (06/29/00, developed and published by Konami)
J-League Jikkyō Winning Eleven 2000 2nd (11/30/00, developed and published by Konami)
J-League Jikkyō Winning Eleven 2001 (06/21/01, developed and published by Konami)

PlayStation 2
Jikkyō J-League Perfect Striker 3 (03/22/01, developed and published by Konami)
J-League Winning Eleven 5 (10/25/01, developed and published by Konami)
Jikkyō J-League Perfect Striker 4 (12/27/01, developed and published by Konami)
Soccer Tsuku 2002: J-League Pro Soccer Club o Tsukurou! (03/07/02, developed by Smilebit and published by Sega)
Jikkyō J-League Perfect Striker 5 (07/25/02, developed and published by Konami)
J-League Winning Eleven 6 (09/19/02, developed and published by Konami)
J-League Tactics Manager (02/13/03, published by Sammy Studios)
J-League Pro Soccer Club o Tsukurou! 3 (06/05/03, developed by Smilebit and published by Sega)
J-League Winning Eleven Tactics (12/11/03, developed and published by Konami)
J-League Pro Soccer Club o Tsukurou! '04 (06/24/04, developed by Smilebit and published by Sega)
J-League Winning Eleven 8: Asia Championship (11/18/04, developed and published by Konami)
J-League Winning Eleven 9: Asia Championship (11/17/05, developed and published by Konami)
J-League Winning Eleven 10 + Europa League 06-07 (11/22/06, developed and published by Konami)
J-League Pro Soccer Club o Tsukurou! 5 (02/01/07, published by Sega)
J-League Winning Eleven 2007 Club Championship (08/02/07, developed and published by Konami)
J-League Winning Eleven 2008 Club Championship (08/21/08, developed and published by Konami)
J-League Winning Eleven 2009 Club Championship (08/06/09, developed and published by Konami)
J-League Winning Eleven 2010 Club Championship (08/05/10, developed and published by Konami)

PlayStation 3
World Soccer Winning Eleven 2012 (2011, developed and published by Konami)
World Soccer Winning Eleven 2013
World Soccer Winning Eleven 2014
FIFA 17
FIFA 18
FIFA 19

PlayStation 4
FIFA 17
FIFA 18
FIFA 19
FIFA 20
FIFA 21
FIFA 22
eFootball 2022

PlayStation Portable
J-League Pro Soccer Club o Tsukurou! 6: Pride of J (11/12/09, published by Sega)
J-League Pro Soccer Club o Tsukurou! 7: Euro Plus (08/04/11, published by Sega)
J-League Pro Soccer Club o Tsukurou! 8: Euro Plus (10/17/13, published by Sega)

Game Gear
J-League GG Pro Striker '94 (07/22/94, developed by Sims and published by Sega)
J-League Soccer: Dream Eleven (11/24/95, developed by Sims and published by Sega)

Mega Drive
J-League Champion Soccer (02/26/93, developed by Krisalis Software and published by Game Arts/Shogakukan)
J-League Pro Striker (06/18/93, published by Sega)
J-League Pro Striker Kanzenban (12/17/93, published by Sega)
J-League Pro Striker 2 (07/15/94, published by Sega)
Pro Striker Final Stage (08/04/95, developed by NexTech and published by Sega)

Saturn
J-League Victory Goal (01/20/95, published by Sega)
J-League Pro Soccer Club o Tsukurou! (02/23/96, published by Sega)
J-League Victory Goal '96 (03/22/96, published by Sega)
J-League Victory Goal '97 (03/14/97, developed by Sims and published by Sega)
J-League Go Go Goal! (05/30/97, published by Tecmo)
J-League Pro Soccer Club o Tsukurou! 2 (11/20/97, 02/04/99, published by Sega)
J-League Jikkyō Honoo no Striker (02/26/98, developed and published by Konami)

Super Famicom
J.League Soccer Prime Goal (08/06/93, published by Namco)
J-League Super Soccer (03/18/94, developed by Probe Entertainment and published by Hudson Soft)
J.League Excite Stage '94 (05/01/94, developed by A-Max and published by Epoch)
J.League Soccer Prime Goal 2 (08/05/94, published by Namco)
J.League Super Soccer '95 Jikkyō Stadium (03/17/95, published by Hudson Soft)
J.League Excite Stage '95 (04/28/95, developed by A-Max and published by Epoch)
J-League Soccer: Prime Goal 3 (08/04/95, published by Namco)
J.League Excite Stage '96 (04/26/96, developed by A-Max and published by Epoch)
J.League '96 Dream Stadium (06/01/96, published by Hudson Soft)
J.League Soccer Ole! Supporters (Unreleased)

Mobile
J-League Pro Soccer Club o Tsukurou! Mobile (2004)
J-League Pro Soccer Club o Tsukurou! Mobile 2 (2005)
J-League Pro Soccer Club o Tsukurou! Mobile 3 (2008)
FIFA Mobile (2016, introduced 2017)
Pro Soccer Club o Tsukurou! Road to World (2018)
PES 2019 Mobile (2018)
eFootball PES 2020 Mobile (2019)

Windows
J-League Pro Soccer Club o Tsukurou! (06/06/02)
Power-up kit (12/09/02)
J-League Pro Soccer Club o Tsukurou! Online (2009/2010)
FIFA 17
FIFA 18
FIFA 19
FIFA 20

Multiple systems
World Soccer Winning Eleven (Japanese version)
FIFA 17 (for Microsoft Windows, Xbox One, PlayStation 4, Xbox 360, PlayStation 3, iOS and Android; 2016)
FIFA 18
FIFA 19
FIFA 20

See also
Zico Soccer (features Kashima Antlers)
Let's Make a Soccer Team! (known in Japan as Pro Soccer Club o Tsukurou! Euro Championship, part of the Pro Soccer Club o Tsukurou! series)
Wave Master, created music for many J.League games released by Sega
List of association football video games

References

External links
J. League at Giant Bomb
J. League games at MobyGames
List of PlayStation Japanese games at The PlayStation Datacenter

 
 
J.League
J.League
J.League